Duwayne Enslin Smart (born 8 August 1987) is a South African professional rugby union player, currently playing with the . His regular position is on the wing.

Career

Youth

He spent 2006 in Welkom, representing the s in the 2006 Under-21 Provincial Championship before returning to George for the 2007 Under-21 Provincial Championship.

SWD Eagles

Despite playing off the bench in their next match, he opened the scoring for the SWD Eagles in their 20–58 defeat to defending champions . However, it wasn't enough to help his side into the quarter finals, finishing in fifth spot in the Southern Section of the competition.

Pumas

He was named in the Pumas squad for the 2011 Vodacom Cup competition, but didn't make any appearances.

Return to SWD Eagles

After making just seven appearances in two-and-a-half years at the Pumas, Smart returned to the  during the 2011 Currie Cup First Division.

Club rugby / SWD Eagles

Smart played club rugby for Progress in the SWD Premier League in 2012 and then moved to Pacaltsdorp-based side Evergreens that recently qualified for the first edition of the SARU Community Cup in 2013. He made three appearances for them in Pool D of the round-robin stage of the competition, scoring a try in their match against Old Selbornians to help them qualify for the finals held in George. He featured in all three of their matches in the finals, but could not prevent them losing all three of their matches to finish eighth overall in the competition.

Smart earned another provincial call-up, however, being included in the SWD Eagles' squad for the 2014 Vodacom Cup.

Boland Cavaliers

Smart made the move to rival Western Cape side the  prior to the 2014 Currie Cup qualification series, where a spot in the 2014 Currie Cup Premier Division was up for grabs for the team that won the competition.

References

South African rugby union players
Living people
1987 births
People from George, South Africa
Rugby union wings
Boland Cavaliers players
Pumas (Currie Cup) players
SWD Eagles players
Rugby union players from the Western Cape